Tavakkolabad or Tavokkalabad or Tuklabad may refer to:

Fars Province
 Tavakkolabad, Fars, a village in Darab County
 Tavakkolabad, Mamasani, a village in Mamasani County

Isfahan Province

Kerman Province
 Tavakkolabad, Anar, a village in Anar County
 Tavakkolabad, Anbarabad, a village in Anbarabad County
 Tavakkolabad, Jebalbarez-e Jonubi, a village in Anbarabad County
 Tavakkolabad, Bam, a village in Bam County
 Tavakkolabad-e Amid, a village in Barsir County
 Tavakkolabad-e Hanarmand, a village in Barsir County
 Tavakkolabad, Fahraj, a village in Fahraj County
 Tavakkolabad, Jiroft, a village in Jiroft County
 Tavakkolabad, Kahnuj, a village in Kahnuj County
 Tavakkolabad, Kerman, a village in Kerman County
 Tavakkolabad, Rayen, a village in Kerman County
 Tavakkolabad, Rabor, a village in Rabor County
 Tavakkolabad, Rafsanjan, a village in Rafsanjan County
 Tavakkolabad-e Do, Rigan, a village in Rigan County
 Tavakkolabad-e Yek, a village in Rigan County
 Tavakkolabad, Rudbar-e Jonubi, a village in Rudbar-e Jonubi County
 Tavakkolabad, Jazmurian, a village in Rudbar-e Jonubi County
 Tavakkolabad, alternate name of Takolabad, a village in Rudbar-e Jonubi County
Tavakkolabad, Khatunabad, a village in Shahr-e Babak County
Tavakkolabad, Khursand, a village in Shahr-e Babak County

Kermanshah Province
 Tavakkolabad, Kermanshah, a village in Kermanshah County

Razavi Khorasan Province
 Tuklabad, Razavi Khorasan

Sistan and Baluchestan Province
 Tavakkolabad (28°37′ N 60°16′ E), Kurin 
 Tavakkolabad (28°37′ N 60°26′ E), Kurin 
 Tavakkolabad, Mirjaveh 
 Tavakkolabad (2), Mirjaveh
 Tavakkolabad, Zahedan 
 Tavakkolabad-e Hurshi , Zahedan County
 Tavakkolabad-e Minuyi

See also
 Kalateh-ye Tuklabad